Walworth Township is a township in Becker County, Minnesota, United States. The population was 88 at the 2000 census.

History
Walworth Township was organized in 1883. It was named after Walworth County, Wisconsin.

Geography
According to the United States Census Bureau, the township has a total area of 36.3 square miles (93.9 km), of which 36.1 square miles (93.6 km) is land and 0.1 square miles (0.3 km) (0.36%) is water.

Adjacent townships
 Flom Township, Norman County (north)
 Popple Grove Township, Mahnomen County (northeast)
 Spring Creek Township (east)
 Riceville Township (southeast)
 Atlanta Township (south)
 Goose Prairie Township, Clay County (southwest)
 Ulen Township, Clay County (west)
 Home Lake Township, Norman County (northwest)

Cemeteries
The township contains Walworth Baptist Cemetery.

Demographics
At the 2020 census, there were 101 people, 43 households and 30 families residing in the township. The population density was 0.41 per square mile (1.077/km). There were 50 housing units at an average density of 1.2/sq mi (0.4/km). The racial makeup of the township was 86.1% White, 4% Asian, and 1.35% from two or more races.

There were 43 households, of which 31.6% had children under the age of 18 living with them, 57.9% were married couples living together, 5.3% had a female householder with no husband present, and 28.9% were non-families. 26.3% of all households were made up of individuals, and 21.8% had someone living alone who was 65 years of age or older. The average household size was 2.32 and the average family size was 2.78.

32.2% of the population were under the age of 18, 5.7% from 18 to 24, 19.3% from 25 to 44, 27.3% from 45 to 64, and 21.8% who were 65 years of age or older. The median age was 50 years. For every 100 females, there were 125.6 males. The gender ratio is 46:41, with there being more females than males.

The median household income was $34,167 and the median family income was $44,375. Males had a median income of $15,625 and females $15,417. The per capita income was $18,440. None of the population and none of the families were below the poverty line.

References
 United States National Atlas
 United States Census Bureau 2007 TIGER/Line Shapefiles
 United States Board on Geographic Names (GNIS)

Townships in Becker County, Minnesota
Townships in Minnesota